Brad Scheer (born 31 August 1998) is a professional Australian rules footballer who plays for the Gold Coast Football Club in the Australian Football League (AFL).

Early life
Scheer was born in Esperance, Western Australia but moved to the Gold Coast at the age of 13. He played his junior football for the Palm Beach Currumbin Lions in the local Gold Coast league and set a club record for the  youngest senior debutant at the age of 15. He also joined the Gold Coast Suns' academy in his teenage years while attending Palm Beach Currumbin High School.

He was selected to represent both Queensland and the Allies at the 2016 AFL Under 18 Championships. While playing for the Allies, Scheer kicked the game-winning goal from the boundary to seal a huge victory over the Victorian Country team. Despite spending the early part of his life in Western Australia, Scheer was eligible to be academy drafted by the Gold Coast Suns as he spent the required five years in their academy zone prior to being drafted.

AFL career
Scheer made his AFL debut in the Gold Coast's twenty-five point win against  at Metricon Stadium in round seven of the 2017 season.

References

 

1998 births
Living people
Gold Coast Football Club players
Southport Australian Football Club players
Australian rules footballers from Western Australia